University of Santo Tomas Publishing House (USTPH) was established in 1996. It was inspired by the four-century-old UST Press, which was founded in 1593. USTPH, formerly the UST Press, is the oldest continuing press in Asia today. It is even older than the University of Santo Tomas, which was established in 1611. At present, it is equipped with high quality printing machines from Germany and advanced computer technology from the United States, Japan, and other countries. The USTPH aims to provide extensively the creative and innovative outputs of the academe, not only within, but also outside the campus.

History
 In 1593, the Dominicans pioneered printing in the Philippines by producing through the old technique of xylography, a wooden block printing press which was exhibited at the UST Museum of Arts and Sciences.
 In 1602, the Dominican Blancas de San Jose together with a Chinese convert in Binondo made molds, types and instruments needed for typography. Typographic printing in the Philippines was indigenous, not imported from other countries it was recognized by Wenceslao Retana as "the semi-invention" of the press in the country.
 In 1625, the press open up at the Colegio de Santo Tomás, soon became a university, and had since been known as the UST Press.
 In 1996, the UST Press was renamed UST Publishing House.
 Writer and literature professor Cristina Pantoja-Hidalgo was hired as director in 2010.

Early Publications
 Doctrina Christiana - a catechism in Tagalog and Spanish. The first book published in the Philippines.
 Baybayin - ancient Tagalog alphabet
 Shih-Lu (Apologia de la Verdadera Religion) - a catechism for the Chinese in the Philippines
 Historia de la Provincia del Santo Rosario de Filipinas by Diego Aduarte - a book about the Dominican Missions in the Far East, which was widely considered to be the best printed book of the 17th century and the last of the incunabulas
 Flora en Filipinas - a classic book by Augustinian Manuel Blanco. It consists of four big volumes with 479 plates, half of them in splendid color lithographs (a copy of the colossal publishing project is preserved in the Rare Books Section of the UST Central Library).

Present Publications
 scholarly books
 outstanding faculty researches
 monographs
 quality textbooks in all levels
 artworks and designs
 other educational printed materials

References

External links
University of Santo Tomas Publishing House

University of Santo Tomas
University presses of the Philippines
Book publishing companies of the Philippines
Publishing companies established in 1996
Companies based in Manila